The Siberian Revolutionary Committee (Sibrevcom) was an extraordinary organ of the Soviet power's revolutionary committee in Siberia created during the Russian Civil War under the circumstances preventing the formal creation of constitutional organs of government. Established on August 27, 1919, it functioned from September 1919 until December 1, 1925, when the Siberian Krai was formed.

References

History of Siberia
Russian Civil War